Braniştea is a Romanian place-name of Slavic origin with the general meaning of "the protected place", such as a royal property , a forest, etc. It may refer to:

 Braniștea, Bistrița-Năsăud, a commune in Bistrița-Năsăud County
 Braniștea, Dâmbovița, a commune in Dâmbovița County
 Braniștea, Galați, a commune in Galați County
 Braniștea, Mehedinți, a commune in Mehedinți County
 Braniştea, a village in Uda, Argeș
 Braniştea, a village in Nicorești Commune, Galați County
 Braniştea, a village in Oinacu Commune, Giurgiu County
 Braniştea, a village in Fundu Moldovei Commune, Suceava County

See also
 Bran (disambiguation)
 Brănești (disambiguation)
 Braniște (disambiguation)